Melicope fellii is a species of tree in the family Rutaceae and is endemic to Queensland. It has trifoliate leaves and pink flowers borne in short panicles in leaf axils.

Description

Taxonomy
Melicope fellii was first formally described in 2001 by Thomas Gordon Hartley in the journal Allertonia from specimens collected in 1997 by Paul Irwin Forster and others. The specific epithet (fellii) honours David G. Fell who collected specimens during a rainforest survey.

Distribution and habitat

Conservation status
This species is classified as of "least concern" under the Queensland Government Nature Conservation Act 1992.

References

fellii
Sapindales of Australia
Flora of Queensland
Plants described in 2001
Taxa named by Thomas Gordon Hartley